Carl Krisko was a Canadian football player who played for the Winnipeg Blue Bombers. He won the Grey Cup with them in 1939.

References

Canadian football guards
Canadian football running backs
Winnipeg Blue Bombers players
1910s births
Year of death missing